Myeonmok-dong is a dong (neighbourhood) of Jungnang-gu in Seoul, South Korea.

See also 
Administrative divisions of South Korea

References

External links
 Jungnang-gu official website in English
 Tourism of Jungnang-gu at the Jungnang-gu official website
 Myeonmok bon-dong resident office website

Neighbourhoods of Jungnang District